WMFS-FM (92.9 MHz) is a United States commercial sports radio radio station in Bartlett, Tennessee, broadcasting to the Memphis, Tennessee area, owned by Audacy, Inc.  WMFS is the radio home for the Memphis Grizzlies.  The station's studios are in Southeast Memphis, and the transmitter tower is in Northeast Memphis.

WMFS-FM broadcasts in the HD Radio format.

History

Rock (1995-2009) 
Originally launched in 1995 by fledgling Belz Broadcasting under the "Solid Rock 92.9 MFS!" slogan, WMFS was acquired by Infinity Broadcasting and rebranded "93X" in 2001. The station was purchased by Entercom Communications in 2006.

The first song played on WMFS when the station debuted was "Rock You Like a Hurricane" by the Scorpions.

WMFS was Memphis' home to Howard Stern prior to his departure from terrestrial radio.

WMFS is one of six radio properties in the Memphis market held by Entercom; the others are WMC-FM, WRVR-FM, WMFS, WLFP, and WMC.  Entercom purchased WMC, WMC-FM and WMFS in 2006.

WMFS-FM/WMFS maintain studios in the Entercom complex in eastern Memphis. The previous studio was located in the WMC-TV building on Union Avenue with Rover's Morning Glory mornings, Sydney in middays, Crate doing afternoons and Beck at night. Former jocks include Shay, Azi, Ditch, Twitch and Killabrew.

The original on-air line-up in 1995 consisted of Dave Robins in the mornings, Jim Fox middays, Zak in the afternoon drive, Leslie in the evenings, and Tony Vazlini (a.k.a. Vasolini, Mark Cantoni) on overnights. Greg Murray replaced Jim Fox during the middays and was also Production Manager.

Sports (2009-present) 
On May 21, 2009, WMFS-FM changed its format to sports, simulcasting WMFS 680 AM.

Beginning in the 2011–12 station, WMFS became the flagship station for the NBA's Memphis Grizzlies.

Previous logos

References

External links
 
 
The Famous/Infamous MFS! Web Site Hack of 1999
I Want the REAL 93X Back

MFS-FM
Radio stations established in 1996
Audacy, Inc. radio stations
Sports radio stations in the United States
ESPN Radio stations